The 1908–09 Bucknell Bison men's basketball team represented Bucknell University during the 1908–09 NCAA men's basketball season. The head coach was George Hoskins, coaching the Bison in his first season.The Bison's team captain was Charles O'Brien.

Schedule

|-

References

Bucknell Bison men's basketball seasons
Bucknell
Bucknell
Bucknell